Cryobacterium roopkundense is a Gram-positive, psychrophilic, aerobic and rod-shaped bacterium from the genus of Cryobacterium which has been isolated from soil from Lake Roopkund in the Himalayas.

References

Microbacteriaceae
Bacteria described in 2010